Panalipa bisignatus is a moth in the family Crambidae. It was described by Charles Swinhoe in 1886. It is found in India.

References

Moths described in 1886
Schoenobiinae